Charles Chadwick CBE (born 1932) is an English novelist.

His father was Trevor Chadwick. Chadwick worked as a civil servant from the early 1970s. He held a position as a British Council officer in Nigeria in 1972, and worked in Kenya, Brazil, Canada, and Poland, where he was the Council's Director.

Chadwick retired from the civil service in 1992. He wrote several novels, all of which were originally rejected by publishers.

In 2004, Chadwick was offered a major Faber and Faber publishing deal for his novel It's All Right Now, which was written over a period of thirty years. In its initial edition, the book was 679 pages, and covered the life of an ordinary middle-aged English man from his thirties into his sixties (tagline: "A written life, an unwritten life", as quoted from last page). The book was published in May 2005 by Faber & Faber in the UK and HarperCollins in the U.S.

He was appointed CBE (Commander of the Order of the British Empire) in 1992 for services to the British Council whilst he was a British Council officer.

References

Further reading
Retired Civil Servant Strikes it Rich. The Guardian, February 18, 2004.
Life Through an Accountant's Averted Eyes. Los Angeles Times, July 17, 2005.
Newsnight Review, BBC, April 4, 2005.
The Kid Is Alright. Newsweek, June 13, 2005.
Ansichten eines Jedermanns. Die Zeit, October 29, 2007.
The Untalented Mr. Ripple. The New York Times, June 26, 2005.
The Long Haul. The Washington Post, July 10, 2005.
A World Unto Himself. Harper's Magazine, July 2005.
Charles Chadwick interview. BookBrowse

1932 births
Living people
21st-century English novelists
English male novelists
21st-century English male writers
British expatriates in Brazil
British expatriates in Kenya
Commanders of the Order of the British Empire